Joseph F. Donelan Jr. (February 16, 1918 – May 27, 1999) was United States Assistant Secretary of State for Administration from June 14, 1971, until March 31, 1973.

Donelan was educated at City College of New York and Georgetown University. He served in the United States Army during World War II. He held multiple appointments in the state department in Washington and also for several years at various times in France, Japan, India and Belgium.

Donelan was a graduate of Newtown High School in Queens, New York.

References

List of Assistant Secretaries

United States Assistant Secretaries of State
1918 births
1999 deaths
Newtown High School alumni
City College of New York alumni
Georgetown University alumni
American expatriates in France
American expatriates in Japan
American expatriates in India
American expatriates in Belgium
United States Army personnel of World War II